This is a list of banks in Iraq.

Central bank
Central Bank of Iraq
Victory international bank *

State-owned banks
Rafidain Bank
Rasheed Bank
Industrial Bank 
Agricultural Cooperative Bank of Iraq 
Real Estate Bank of Iraq 
Bank of Iraq 
Trade Bank of Iraq

Private banks
Al Qurtas Islamic Bank for Investment and Finance (QIB)
International Development Bank of Iraq (IDB)
Ashur International Bank for Investment
FIRST IRAQI BANK
Albaraka Bank Turkey
Kurdistan International Bank
Ghana Bank
Babylon Bank
Bank of Baghdad
Basrah International Bank for Investment
Commercial Bank of Iraq
Credit Bank of Iraq
Dar Es Salaam Investment Bank
Dijlah & Furat Bank
Economy Bank Iraq
Gulf Commercial Bank
Taawen Islamic Bank
Industrial Union Investment Bank
Investment Bank of Iraq
Iraqi Middle East Investment Bank
Islamic Bank
Mosul Bank
National Bank of Iraq
North Bank
Sumer Bank
Union Bank of Iraq
Bank Audi
ِWorld Islamic Bank
ِElaf Islamic Bank
United Investment Bank
Al Janoob Islamic Bank
 T.C. Ziraat Bankasi of Turkey (the Turkish state agricultural bank)
 Bank Mili Iran (the national bank of Iran)
Byblos Bank (Lebanese)

International banks
Standard Chartered Bank

See also
 List of banks in the Arab world

References

External links
Financial institutions operating in Iraq
Iraqi financial institutions News

Iraq
Banks
Iraq